AQPS ("Autre Que Pur-Sang"), translated as "Other than Thoroughbred" (not "Other than Pure-Blood"), is a general term used in France to refer to horses not listed as Thoroughbreds but destined to race. Anglo-Arabians, Selle Français (or French Riding Horse), and French Trotters plus all other crossbreds can be qualified, in theory, as AQPS. However in practical terms an AQPS is akin to a Thoroughbred but not eligible to that breed's stud-book. The designation usually means one parent is not listed in the Thoroughbred stud book and almost always applies to those horses with Selle Français breeding in the dam line, be it very remote through repeated crosses with TB stallions. Reverse crosses are also performed by crossing a Thoroughbred mare with an AQPS-approved stallion, and this has met with success on the race-track.

For many years the AQPS were registered for administrative purposes as Selle Français. Since 2005 an AQPS studbook is now maintained with its specific breeding rules. 

The AQPS racing breed developed around the end of the 19th century when French farmers began to cross cart horse mares with Thoroughbred stallions to produce a fast and hardy horse that has proven to be best suited for steeplechase racing. The French national studs made available to local breeders at affordable prices "stayer" TB stallions which were disregarded by the flat-race industry. The average person most likely would not be able to see any difference between an AQPS and a Thoroughbred as evolution of the breed has resulted in AQPS horses today being a minimum of 87.5 percent Thoroughbred. The remaining 12.5 percent must be French saddle-bred, usually from AQPS itself but Selle Français and Anglo-Arab blood is also permissible. The fact that many AQPS horses have now over 98% of Thoroughbred blood is raising questions about the relevance of the breed. 
 
The Association des Eleveurs d'AQPS is a member partner in the French Racing and Breeding Committee (FRBC).

If anything, the AQPS is a form of repeat of what was done in England 300 years ago with the Thoroughbred, albeit with French foundation mares. 

Probably the best-known AQPS horse in the world is Al Capone II, who won the Grade One Grand Steeple-Chase de Paris in 1997 plus seven consecutive Grade One Prix La Haye Jousselin steeplechase races at Auteuil Hippodrome from 1993 through 1999. His full brother The Fellow won the Prix La Haye Jousselin in 1990, the Grand Steeple-Chase de Paris in 1991 and enjoyed even greater success in England where he won the King George VI Chase in 1991 and 1992 and the Cheltenham Gold Cup in 1994. First Gold met with success in the King George VI Chase in 2000, winning by 12 lengths, and followed on to win the Punchestown Gold Cup.

Mon Mome, winner of the Grand National in 2009, followed by Neptune Collonges in 2012 are AQPS horses, as is Orphée des Blins, winner of The Grand Pardubice Steeplechase 2012, 2013 and 2014 and Edredon Bleu, winner of the Champion Chase in 2000 and the King George in 2003.

References 
 French Racing and Breeding Committee
 Thoroughbred Heritage

Types of horse
Horse racing in France
Part-Arabian breeds of horses and ponies